DJ Three is an American DJ with a DJing sound encompassing house, techno and beyond.

History
He has held residencies at Florida's Simon's and NYC's Twilo and has played lauded guest spots with San Francisco's Wicked Crew and the UK's Fabric.

Collaborations
 With David Christophere (Rabbit in the Moon) as Three A.M.
 With Michael Donaldson (Q-Burns Abstract Message) as Montage Men
 With Sean Cusick (Q6) as Second Hand Satellites
 With Derek Plaslaiko (Spectral) as "Three-D"

Selected discography
 Rabbit in the Moon - Out of Body Experience (Three A.M.'s Burning Spear mix) - Hardkiss US
 Rabbit in the Moon - Floori.d.a. (Three A.M.'s Dub for Strangeways) - Hallucination US / Abnormal UK
 Second-Hand Satellites - Multiple Mirrors EP - Hallucination US / Shaboom UK
 Second-Hand Satellites - Multiple Mirrors Part 2 - new versions by S.H.S., Phillip Charles, Blakkat - Shaboom UK
 Lypid - The Sign's Alive (Montage Men dub) - Statra Recordings US
 John Creamer and Stephane K. - I Wish U Were Here - (Three A.M.'s Dub for Wanderlust) - Alternative Route UK
 U.N.K.L.E. – Reign (Three A.M.’s Black Swan Vocal mix) – GU Music US
 Mish Mash feat. Lois - Speechless (Three's Lost in Translation mix) - Crosstown Rebels
 Sasha - Coma (Three's star Spangled Remix) - White

References

External links
 Hallucination Recordings
 Hallucination Limited
 Bookings

Remixers
Club DJs
American house musicians